Noor Azian Alias is a road cyclist from Malaysia. She represented her nation at the 2010 UCI Road World Championships.

References

External links
 profile at Procyclingstats.com

Malaysian female cyclists
Living people
Place of birth missing (living people)
Cyclists at the 2006 Asian Games
Cyclists at the 2010 Asian Games
Year of birth missing (living people)
Southeast Asian Games medalists in cycling
Southeast Asian Games gold medalists for Malaysia
Competitors at the 2005 Southeast Asian Games
Asian Games competitors for Malaysia